The Taurus Mountains (Turkish: Toros Dağları or Toroslar) are a mountain complex in southern Turkey, separating the Mediterranean coastal region from the central Anatolian Plateau. The system extends along a curve from Lake Eğirdir in the west to the upper reaches of the Euphrates and Tigris rivers in the east. It is a part of the Alpide belt in Eurasia.

Etymology 
The mountain range under the current name was mentioned in The Histories by Polybius as Ταῦρος (Taûros). Heinrich Kiepert writes in Lehrbuch der alten Geographie that the name was borrowed into Ancient Greek from the Semitic (Old Aramaic) root טורא ṭūrā, meaning "mountain".

Geography
The Taurus mountains are divided into three chains from west to east as follows;
 Western Taurus (Batı Toroslar)
Central Taurus (Orta Toroslar)
Southeastern Taurus (Güneydoğu Toroslar)

Western Taurus

The Western Taurus Mountains form an arc around the Gulf of Antalya. It includes the Akdağlar, Bey Mountains, Katrancık Mountain, Kuyucak Mountains, and Geyik Mountains. The East Taşeli Plateau and Goksu River divide it from the Central Taurus Mountains. It has many peaks rising above . Mt. Kizlarsivrisi, in the Bey Mountains is the highest peak in the Western Taurus.

Central Taurus
The Central Taurus Mountains are roughly defined to include northern Mersin Province and northwestern Adana Province. The highest point in the Central Taurus is Mt. Demirkazık (3,756m). The Cilician Gates or Gülek Pass has been the principal pass through the Eastern Taurus since ancient times, connecting the coastal plain of Cilicia with Central Anatolia. The Tarsus-Ankara Highway (E90, O-21) passes through it. Mountain ranges in the Central Taurus include:
Akçalı Mountains, western
Bolkar Mountains, central, highest peak Mt. Medetsiz 
Aladaglar mountain range, central, highest peak Mt. Kızılkaya 
Tahtalı Mountains or Anti-Taurus Mountains
Munzur mountain range, eastern, highest peak Mt. Akbaba 
Mercan mountain range, within the Munzur

Southeastern Taurus
The Southeastern Taurus mountains form the northern boundary of the Southeastern Anatolia Region and North Mesopotamia. They include the Nurhak Mountains, Malatya Mountains, Maden Mountains, Genç Mountains, and Bitlis Mountains. They are in the watershed of the Euphrates River and Tigris River.

Geology
The Taurus Mountains were formed by the collision of the African and Eurasian tectonic plates. The predominant underlying rock is limestone. In the Aladaglar and Bolkar mountains, limestone has eroded to form karstic landscapes of waterfalls, underground rivers, and some of the largest caves of Asia. The Manavgat River originates on the southern slopes of the Beydaglari range.

Climate
The mountains have a Mediterranean climate, with dry summers and rainy winters. Temperatures vary with elevation, with warm winters on the lower coastal slopes and cold winters in the high mountains and in the interior.

Flora and fauna

At lower elevations, the predominant vegetation forest and woodland of evergreen oaks and Turkish pine (Pinus brutia), and areas of maquis shrubland. Above 1200 meters elevation are montane forests of black pine (Pinus nigra), Lebanon cedar (Cedrus libani), Taurus fir (Abies cilicica), and juniper (Juniperus spp.). The high peaks are home to alpine meadows.

History

Pre-history and early Roman period
The bull was commonly the symbol and depiction of ancient Near Eastern storm gods, hence Taurus the bull, and hence the name of the mountains. The mountains are a place of many ancient storm-god temples. Torrential thunderstorms in these mountains were deemed by the ancient Syrians to be the work of the storm-god Adad to make the Tigris and Euphrates rivers rise and flood and thereby fertilise their land. The Hurrians, probably originators of the various storm-gods of the ancient Near East, were a people whom modern scholars place in the Taurus Mountains at their probable earliest origins.

A Bronze Age archaeological site, where early evidence of tin mining was found, is at Kestel. The pass known in antiquity as the Cilician Gates crosses the range north of Tarsus.

The Amanus range in southern Turkey is where the Taurus Mountains are pushed up as three tectonic plates come together. The Amanus is a natural frontier: west is Cilicia, east is Syria. There are several passes, like the Amanian Gate (Bahçe Pass), which are of great strategical importance. In 333 BC at the Battle of Issus, Alexander the Great defeated Darius III in the foothills along the coast between these two passes. In the Second Temple period, Jewish authors seeking to establish with greater precision the geographical definition of the Promised Land, began to construe Mount Hor as a reference to the Amanus range of the Taurus Mountains, which marked the northern limit of the Syrian plain.

Late Roman period to present 
During World War I, the German and Turkish railway system through the Taurus Mountains proved to be a major strategic objective of the Allies. This region was specifically mentioned as a strategically controlled objective slated for surrender to the Allies in the Armistice, which ended hostilities against the Ottoman Empire.

Attractions

The Varda Viaduct, situated on the railway lines Konya-Adana at Hacıkırı village in Adana Province, is a  railway bridge constructed in the 1910s by Germans.

See also
 Ark of Nuh or Noah
 Armenian highlands
 Mountains of Ararat
 Karaca Dağ near Diyarbakır
 River system of Mesopotamia
 Zagros Mountains
 Mount Judi

References

External links
 map of Eurasia showing Taurus Mountain ranges

 
Mountain ranges of Turkey
Central Anatolia Region
Mediterranean Region, Turkey
Southeastern Anatolia Region
Upper Mesopotamia
Physiographic provinces